The Iranian Parliament Committee on Economic, or Economic Committee is a standing committee of the Islamic Consultative Assembly of Representatives. The Parliament Committee on Economic has general economic, and it can recommend funding appropriations for various governmental agencies, programs, and activities, as defined by House rules. in the 11th parliament; Mohammad Reza Pour Ebrahimi was president, Kazem Mousavi first deputy and TBD second deputy.

See also 
 Specialized Commissions of the Parliament of Iran
 Joint Commission of the Islamic Consultative Assembly
 Special Commission of the Islamic Consultative Assembly
 The history of the parliament in Iran

References

Committees of the Iranian Parliament
Economy of Iran